A sky villa is a housing concept which brings together the designs of villas and apartments into a single construct. It is essentially a very large apartment, either spanning an entire floor of an apartment building (or even two or more floors). Normally considered in the premium or luxury category of real estates around the globe, sky villas bring together living in a wide home space with the security and amenities of living in an apartment. An example of the luxury class of a sky villa is the single two floor sky villa suite of the Palms Casino Resort's fantasy tower which is billed at US$35,487 per night, making it the fifth expensive among the world's 15 most expensive suites.

Sky villas today are easily attributed with a heavy price tag and numerous amenities which includes having a butler and five-star chef on premises. Sky Villas are designed for exclusivity and extreme comforts of the residents and therefore not easily affordable. It is very much unlike penthouses where the luxury amenities are limited only to the residents of the penthouse, in a sky villa every resident have access to the luxury amenities along with privacy and security.

Sky villas worldwide
Following are some sky villas or buildings having sky villas around the world

 Fantasy Tower of Palms Casino Resort - Las Vegas, Nevada
 Honolulu Sky Villa - Honolulu, Hawai
 Gables by the Bay - Goa, India
 SKYDHAM Sky Villas - Mumbai, India
 Sathorn Sky Villas - Bangkok, Thailand
 Azalea – Skyvillas - Thrissur, Kerala, India
 Olympia Opaline Skyvilla, Navalur, Chennai- India
 81 Aureate, Bandra West, Mumbai - India
 Bhandary Vertica, Kadri, Mangalore - India
 Citadel Callista Sky Villa, Kadri, Mangalore - India
 Regent Residences, Việt Nam

References

Apartment types
Villas